Samuel Plimsoll (10 February 1824 – 3 June 1898) was a British politician and social reformer, now best remembered for having devised the Plimsoll line (a line on a ship's hull indicating the maximum safe draught, and therefore the minimum freeboard for the vessel in various operating conditions).

Early life
Samuel Plimsoll was born in Bristol and soon moved to Whiteley Wood Hall, Sheffield, also spending part of his childhood in Penrith, Cumberland.  Leaving school at an early age, he became a clerk at Rawson's Brewery, and rose to be manager.

In 1853, he attempted to become a coal merchant in London. He failed and was reduced to destitution. He himself told how for a time he lived in a common lodging for seven shillings and two pence a week.

Through this experience, he learnt to sympathise with the struggles of the poor, and when his good fortune returned, he resolved to devote his time to improving their condition.

His efforts were directed especially against what were known as "coffin ships": unseaworthy and overloaded vessels, often heavily insured, in which unscrupulous owners risked the lives of their crews.

Political career
In 1867, Plimsoll was elected as the Liberal Member of Parliament for Derby, and endeavoured in vain to pass a bill dealing with the subject of a safe load line on ships. The main problem was the number of powerful ship-owning MPs in Parliament.

In 1873, he published a work entitled Our Seamen, which became well known throughout the country.  Accordingly, on Plimsoll's motion in 1873, a Royal Commission was appointed, and in 1875 a government bill was introduced, which Plimsoll, though regarding it as inadequate, resolved to accept.

On 22 July, the Prime Minister, Benjamin Disraeli, announced that the bill would be dropped. Plimsoll lost his self-control, applied the term "villains" to members of the House, and shook his fist in the Speaker's face.

Disraeli moved that he be reprimanded, but on the suggestion of Lord Hartington agreed to adjourn the matter for a week to allow Plimsoll time for thought.

Eventually Plimsoll made an apology. Many people, however, shared his view that the bill had been stifled by the pressure of the shipowners, and popular feeling forced the government to pass a bill which in the following year was amended into the Merchant Shipping Act.

This gave stringent powers of inspection to the Board of Trade, and the mark that indicates the safe limit to which a ship may be loaded became generally known as Plimsoll's mark or line.

Plimsoll was re-elected for Derby at the uk general election of 1880 by a great majority, but gave up his seat to William Vernon Harcourt, believing that the latter, as Home Secretary, could advance sailors' interests more effectively than any private member.

Offered a seat by 30 constituencies, Plimsoll was an unsuccessful candidate in Sheffield Central in 1885. He did not re-enter the house, and later became estranged from the Liberal leaders by what he regarded as their breach of faith in neglecting the question of shipping reform.

He was for some years the honorary president of the National Sailors' and Firemen's Union, and drew attention to the horrors of the cattle-ships, where animals were transported under appalling and over-crowded conditions.

Later life
Later, he visited the United States to try to secure the adoption of a less bitter tone towards England in the historical textbooks used in American schools. 
He died in Folkestone on 3 June 1898, and is buried in St Martin's churchyard, Cheriton, Kent.

Family
Plimsoll married his first wife, Eliza Ann, daughter of Hugh Railton of Chapeltown, near Sheffield, in 1858. In Census 1871 they were enumerated in Hastings where Eliza Ann is recorded as being blind in her right eye and deaf in her left ear. She died in Australia in 1882. There were no children by this marriage. He married his second wife, Harriet Frankish, daughter of Mr. Joseph Armitage Wade, J.P., of Hull and Hornsea, in 1885. By this marriage there were six children, of whom a son, Samuel Richard Cobden Plimsoll, and two daughters survived him.

Legacy

In 1873, the Samuel Plimsoll, an iron hulled full-rigged merchant sailing ship, was launched at the shipyard of Walter Hood & Co. in Aberdeen, Scotland for the Aberdeen White Star Line (G. Thompson & Co.).  She was assigned the official British Reg. No. 65097 and the signal MKDH.  In 1899, she caught fire in the Thames River and had to be scuttled, but was refloated and repaired in 1900.  In 1902, she was severely dismasted and damaged on voyage to Port Chalmers, Australia. Towed to Sydney and subsequently to Fremantle, she was reduced to hulk status the following year.

In the 1920s, Plimsoll shoes were named for their similarity in appearance to the Plimsoll line on boats.

In Whitehall Garden, a Victoria Embankment garden, there is a monument to Samuel Plimsoll in front of the railings.

A monument bust of Plimsoll is located in his native Bristol, on the banks of Bristol Harbour in the Canons Marsh area.

British writer Nicolette Jones published The Plimsoll Sensation, a highly acclaimed biography – getting the idea for it from living in 1995 in Plimsoll Road in Finsbury Park, north London, but knowing hardly anything about whom it was named after.

Samuel Plimsoll appears in the third series of the BBC historical television drama The Onedin Line, portrayed by actor David Garfield.

References

Attribution

External links

 "Our Seamen: An Appeal" by Samuel Plimsoll, 1873, at The Internet Archive
"The sailor's friend" (book review), The Economist, Jul 6th 2006 (payment required)
"The Plimsoll Sensation" (podcast), The British Library, Jul 7th 2006#
 "The Bottom Line About Mr. Plimsoll", The Observer, 25 June 2006
 Review of "The Plimsoll Sensation" in Bookworm on the Net, 2 July 2006
 Re: Monument in Whitehall Garden. London Parks & Gardens Trust, London Gardens Online.  See under heading 'Fuller Information', paragraph 'The south-western sections..'."
 

 

1824 births
1898 deaths
People from Fulwood, Sheffield
Liberal Party (UK) MPs for English constituencies
Politicians from Sheffield
UK MPs 1868–1874
UK MPs 1874–1880
UK MPs 1880–1885
British reformers
British social reformers
Burials in Kent